Tore Johan Klevstuen (born 12 June 1966) is a Norwegian speed skater. He was born in Oppdal, and represented the club Oslo SK. He competed in short track speed skating at the 1994 Winter Olympics.

References

External links

1966 births
Living people
People from Sør-Trøndelag
People from Oppdal
Norwegian male speed skaters
Norwegian male short track speed skaters
Olympic short track speed skaters of Norway
Short track speed skaters at the 1994 Winter Olympics
Sportspeople from Trøndelag